Events from the year 1788 in Ireland.

Incumbent
Monarch: George III

Events
1 August – English Market in Cork is opened.
Belfast Reading Society is established in Belfast, later to become the Linen Hall Library.

Births
12 September – Alexander Campbell, religious leader in Britain and the United States (died 1866).
14 October – Edward Sabine, astronomer, scientist, ornithologist and explorer (died 1883).
James Murray, physician (died 1871).

Deaths
5 March – Guy Johnson, military officer and diplomat (born c1740).
9 June – Hector Theophilus de Cramahé, Lieutenant-Governor of Province of Quebec, and Lieutenant Governor of Detroit (born 1720).

References

 
Years of the 18th century in Ireland
Ireland
1780s in Ireland